Miss Teen USA 1986, the 4th Miss Teen USA pageant, was televised live from Ocean Center, Daytona Beach, Florida on January 21, 1986. At the conclusion of the final competition, Allison Brown of Oklahoma was crowned by outgoing queen Kelly Hu of Hawaii.

This was the first year the pageant was held in Daytona Beach, although it had been staged in Miami the previous year. The pageant was hosted by Michael Young, the host from 1983 to 1984 who returned from hosting after a break in 1985.  Colour commentary was provided by Morgan Brittany, and there was entertainment from The Commodores.

Results

Placements

Special awards

Final competition scores

 Winner 
 First runner-up
 Second runner-up 
 Third runner-up
 Fourth runner-up

Historical significance 
 Oklahoma wins competition for the first time. Also becoming in the 4th state who wins Miss Teen USA.
 Texas earns the 1st runner-up position for the first time. 
 New York earns the 2nd runner-up position for the first time.
 Virginia earns the 3rd runner-up position for the first time.
 South Dakota earns the 4th runner-up position for the first time and reaches its highest placement ever at the contest.
 The only state that placed in semifinals the previous year was Texas. 
 Texas placed for the fourth consecutive year. 
 New Mexico and Oklahoma last placed in 1984.
 New York and Virginia last placed in 1983.
 Florida placed for the first time.
 Louisiana placed for the first time.
 New Jersey placed for the first time.
 South Dakota placed for the first time.
 West Virginia placed for the first time.
 Hawaii, Illinois, North Carolina and North Dakota break an ongoing streak of placements since 1984.

Judges
Beverly Sassoon
Tim Foli
Susan Richardson
Henry Polic II
Beverly Johnson
Allen Fawcett
Randy Ronsfeld
Marj Dusay
Bobby To
Cherise Haugen
Hinton Battle

Delegates
The Miss Teen USA 1986 delegates were:

 Alabama - Dell McGhee
 Alaska - Bobbie Mitchell
 Arizona - Kristy Vanney
 Arkansas - Dana Moody
 California - Michelle Lowell
 Colorado - Raeanne Durkee
 Connecticut - Sherry Durweckie
 Delaware - Laura Hawthorne
 District of Columbia - Melissa Gilbert
 Florida - Stefanie Smith - Age: 16
 Georgia - Wendy Newendorf
 Hawaii - Michelle Hardin
 Idaho - Kathryn Comba
 Illinois - Diane Lowery
 Indiana - Kristan Heck
 Iowa - Kristin Hudson
 Kansas - Kimberlee Girrens
 Kentucky - Amy Miller
 Louisiana - Shasta St. Angelo - Age: 16
 Maine - Linda Kiene
 Maryland - Julie Stanford
 Massachusetts - Michelle King
 Michigan - Sherry Turner
 Minnesota - Jennifer Geckal
 Mississippi - Michelle Veshay
 Missouri - Jennifer Tangora
 Montana - Karry Koslecki
 Nebraska - Elizabeth Beshay
 Nevada - Wendy Stuart
 New Hampshire - Diane Dothan
 New Jersey - Rosalie Cuzo - Age: 17
 New Mexico - Kerali Hansen - Age: 17
 New York -  Claudia Liem - Age: 15
 North Carolina - Denise Jenkins
 North Dakota - Shannon Keiser
 Ohio - Michele Beane
 Oklahoma - Allison Brown - Age: 17
 Oregon - Dana Christiansen
 Pennsylvania - Melissa Forlini
 Rhode Island - Lori Damiani
 South Carolina - Angela Shuler
 South Dakota - Valerie Marsden - Age: 17
 Tennessee - Wendy Alaose
 Texas - Becky Pestana - Age: 17
 Utah - Michelle Montgomery
 Vermont - Holly Mickable
 Virginia - Angela Thigpen - Age: 15
 Washington - Lisa Elliot
 West Virginia - Jodi Caldwell - Age: 15
 Wisconsin - Lanae Elizabeth St.John
 Wyoming - Julie Henry

Historical significance
 Allison Brown (Oklahoma) competed in the 1987 Miss USA pageant as Miss Teen USA but did not place.
New York placed for the first time since Ruth Zakarian won in 1983, and Virginia placed for the first time since 1983, when Tina Marocco was first runner-up to Zakarian.
South Dakota placed for the first time.  This is one of only two placements by South Dakotan teens.
West Virginia, Louisiana, New Jersey and Florida also placed for the first time.  Florida would not place again until 1994.
Texas placed for the fourth consecutive time.

Delegates Notes
Wendy Neuendorf (Georgia) later won the Miss Alabama 1990 and represented Alabama at Miss America 1991.
Allison Brown competed in the Miss USA 1987 pageant as Miss Teen USA.  At the time, Miss Teen USA winners were entitled to compete at Miss USA without winning state titles.
Other contestants who later competed at Miss USA were
Angela Shuler (South Carolina) - Miss South Carolina USA 1989
Julie Stanford (Maryland) - Miss Maryland USA 1990
Kimberlee Girrens (Kansas) - Miss Kansas USA 1992 (finalist at Miss USA 1992)
Linda Marie Kiene (Maine) - Miss Maine USA 1992

References

External links

 Miss Teen USA official website

1986
1986 beauty pageants
1986 in Florida